ACES is the common abbreviation for the compound N-(2-Acetamido)-2-aminoethanesulfonic acid.

ACES is one of Good's buffers developed in the 1960s to provide buffers with pH ranging from 6.15-8.35 for use in various applications.  With a pKa of 6.9, it is often used as a buffering agent in biological and biochemical research.  It is a zwitterionic buffer with a useful buffering range of 6.1-7.5.  The pioneering publication by Good and his co-workers described the synthesis and physical properties of ACES buffer.

Applications
ACES had been used to develop buffers for both agarose and polyacrylamide gel electrophoresis.  
ACES use in isoelectric focusing of proteins has also been documented.  Use of ACES has been published in a protocol for the analysis of bacterial autolysins in a discontinuous SDS-PAGE system.  Potential inhibition of ACES and other Good buffers has been investigated in γ-aminobutyric acid receptor binding to rat brain synaptic membranes.

References

Buffer solutions